Hawk's Tor may refer to:

 Hawk's Tor, Blisland (307 m), a hill on Bodmin Moor, Cornwall, England
 Hawk's Tor, North Hill (329 m), a hill on Bodmin Moor, Cornwall, England

See also
 Tor House and Hawk Tower, built by poet Robinson Jeffers in California